The Huave (also spelled Huavi or Wabi) are an indigenous people of Mexico. The autodenomination term used by the Huave themselves is Ikoots or Kunajts (the first-person inclusive pronoun, thus meaning "Us"), or Mareños (meaning "Sea People" in Spanish). They have inhabited the Isthmus of Tehuantepec for more than 3000 years, preceding the Zapotec people in settling the area. Today they inhabit several villages (most notably San Mateo del Mar, in the Tehuantepec District, and Santa María del Mar, San Dionisio del Mar and San Francisco del Mar, in the Juchitán District) on the sandspits of the Pacific Ocean and trade marine products with inland neighbors. According to the 2000 census, 13,687 people declared themselves to be Huave speakers, however, many non-speakers still identify as Huaves or Mareños. Their language is called Huave, or ombeayiüts/umbeyajts, depending on the dialect.

Many Huave people work as fishermen and agriculturalists. Huave families are patrilocal and reside in homes with thatched roofs. Male members of each Huave village belong to the escalafón, which is a community organization for civic and religious affairs.

Languages
Huave people speak four languages, some of which are mutually intelligible: San Dionisio del Mar Huave, San Francisco del Mar Huave, San Mateo del Mar Huave, and San María del Mar Huave. They also speak Spanish.

Notes

References 
 Kim, Yuni (2008). "Topics in the Phonology and Morphology of San Francisco del Mar Huave". PhD dissertation. Berkeley.
 Pelliccioni, Franco,IL CAMBIAMENTO CULTURALE TRA GLI INDIOS LAGUNARI DI SANTA MARIA DEL MAR (OAXACA, MEXICO). ALCUNE OSSERVAZIONI, 1979 

Indigenous peoples in Mexico